Where Is Fred? (German: Wo ist Fred?), also credited as Where Is Fred!?, is a 2006 German film directed by Anno Saul, and produced by Philip Voges and Eberhard Junkersdorf. Written by Bora Dağtekin, it stars Til Schweiger, Alexandra Maria Lara, Jürgen Vogel and Christoph Maria Herbst.

Plot summary 
Fred plans to marry his girlfriend Mara, and he proposes to her in front of a sold-out basketball arena. Instead of accepting, Mara puts that decision on her spoiled son Linus. In order to get Linus to like him, Fred decides to give him a basketball from his favorite team. He poses as a fan using a wheelchair so that he can get it, but when he catches the ball, he also catches the attention of the young, attractive filmmaker Denise, who wants to feature a disabled fan in a PR campaign for the team. Fred has to keep playing his role, while the real disabled and really furious fan Ronny might call his bluff at any moment.

Cast 
 Til Schweiger as Fred
 Alexandra Maria Lara as Denise
 Jürgen Vogel as Alex
 Christoph Maria Herbst as Ronnie
 Anja Kling as Mara
 Ramon Julia König as Linus
 Gerit Kling as Mara's Sister Sabine
 Pasquale Aleardi as Benno Held
 Tanja Wenzel as Vicky
 David Scheller as Zlatko
 Fahri Yardım as Mehmet
 Daniel Steiner as Christian
 Vanessa Petruo as Julia
  as Stefan
 Ursela Monn as Mrs. Grundmann
  as Mr. Hubert
 Kurt Krömer as Mr. Bubback
  as Niklas
 Adele Neuhauser as Mrs. Hildegart
  as Mr. Grundmann

Other releases 
Where Is Fred? was released on DVD on 14 May 2007, and on Blu-ray on 21 January 2011. The soundtrack album was released on 17 November 2006 through the Polystar Records.

Soundtrack listing 

 Bob Geldof — "Room 19 (Sha La La La Lee)"
 Bass]— "Playing Games Remix"
 Mr. Scruff — "Spandex Man"
 Absynthe Minded — "Pretty Horny Flow Full"
 Swinging Girls — "Lass Dich Mit Musik Verwöhnen"
 Giuseppe Verdi — "Il Trovatore: Anvil Chorus (Act II)"
 Orson — "No Tomorrow"
 New Found Glory — "I Don't Wanna Know"
 Paris — "Freedom"
 James Brown — "Get Up (I Feel Like Being a) Sex Machine"
 Timid Tiger — "Miss Murray"
 Siebeth feat. Miss Jessica — "3 Minutes"
 Snow Patrol — "Chasing Cars"

Reception

Critical response 
Where Is Fred? received mixed to negative reviews. Prisma-Online.de described the film as "flat, childish, annoying and stupid". The Lexicon of International Films named it as "the mix of desolate confusion, outrageous script and irritating stereotype". However, F. M. Hemke of Filmszene.de wrote that Where Is Fred? was a "really funny and entertaining film, a successful firework of situation comedy, despite a lame start", and gave the film seven out of ten points. Matthew Englander of Live Journal gave the film rather mixed review, writing, "have to admit that parts of it were quite funny but overall it went on too long". Marcus Kleine Filmseit called the film "politically incorrect", but praised the performance of Christoph Maria Herbst. Claudia Wente also praised the performance of Jürgen Vogel and wrote that he "played with convincing ease".

Accolades 
Tanja Wenzel won Undine Award for Best Young Comedian for her performance, while Til Schweiger won Jupiter Award for Best German Actor.

Release dates

References

External links 
 Official Website
 

2006 films
2006 comedy films
German comedy films
2000s German-language films
Films set in Berlin
Films set in Germany
Films about paraplegics or quadriplegics
2000s German films